Xinzhou District is an urban district and the seat of the city of Shangrao, Jiangxi province, China.

Administrative divisions
In the present, Xinzhou District has 6 subdistricts and 3 towns.
6 subdistricts

3 towns
 Shaxi
 Chaoyang
 Qinfeng

See also

References

External links
  Government site - 

Shangrao
Xinzhou